Nvart Nancy Avesyan (born 14 February 1990), known as Nancy Avesyan, is an American-born Armenian footballer who plays as a midfielder for the Armenia women's national team.

International career
Avesyan capped for Armenia at senior level in two friendlies against Lithuania on 4 and 6 March 2020.

See also
List of Armenia women's international footballers

References

External links

1990 births
Living people
Citizens of Armenia through descent
Armenian women's footballers
Women's association football midfielders
Women's association football forwards
Armenia women's international footballers
American women's soccer players
Soccer players from California
Sportspeople from Los Angeles County, California
American people of Armenian descent
Cal State Northridge Matadors women's soccer players
Women's Premier Soccer League players
Los Angeles Strikers players